The New Phil Silvers Show is an American situation comedy television series starring Phil Silvers which centers around a factory foreman who is always involved in get-rich-quick schemes. Original episodes aired from September 28, 1963, until April 25, 1964.

Synopsis

Harry Grafton is a factory foreman at Osborne Industries, a company in Los Angeles, California, which manufactures a constantly changing line of items. Trying to earn as much as possible while doing as little as possible, Harry is manipulative and a conman, and is always trying to beat the system. He makes money off his fellow employees by running the Osborne Industries coffee cart service and through his ownership of the company′s vending machines. From his office at the factory, he also secretly operates his own company, Grafton Enterprises, through which he habitually pursues scams and get-rich-quick schemes which never seem to work out for him. Harry has to get around his boss, Mr. Brink, to pursue his schemes, and often enlists the much-suffering workers on the factory floor in his efforts to fulfill them. His plans usually end in disaster.

In February 1964, Harry moves in with his widowed sister Audrey and her two children, Susan and Andy. Harry's family issues then also begin to play an increasing part in his misadventures.

Cast
Phil Silvers....Harry Grafton
Stafford Repp....Brink
Herbie Faye....Waluska
Bert Convy...Roxy (pilot episode only)
Pat Renella.... Roxy (except pilot episode)
Jim Shane....Lester
Douglass Dumbrille....Mr. Osborne
Steve Mitchell...Fred Starkey
Bob Williams....Bob
Buddy Lester....Nick
Norm Grabowski....Grabowski
Elaine Gardner....Louise
Elena Verdugo....Audrey (1964)
Sandy Descher....Susan (1964)
Ronnie Dapo....Andy (1964)

Production

Phil Silvers had a successful four-season run from 1955 to 1959 portraying Sergeant Ernie Bilko in The Phil Silvers Show. Four years after that show ended, The New Phil Silvers Show represented his attempt after a four-season absence from series television to reincarnate the successful Bilko character in the guise of Harry Grafton, with Silvers playing essentially the same character, albeit as a civilian factory foreman rather than a United States Army sergeant. Where Bilko had been popular, however, the Harry Grafton character turned viewers off: While Bilko had a soft spot, Harry was dishonest and manipulative through and through, and while Bilko was an underpaid, underdog sergeant trying to swindle faceless and implacable things like the United States Government and the U.S. Army just to make a little extra money, Harry had a good-paying job but still refused to do an honest day's work for a day's pay, and his scams and schemes involved exploiting and cheating blue-collar workers who were trying to make an honest living on the factory floor.

With The New Phil Silvers Show struggling in the ratings and after receiving many complaints about the show's premise and the Harry Grafton character′s lack of appeal, CBS moved The New Phil Silvers Show to a later time partway through November 1963. When that did not improve ratings, the show began a transition to a new premise as a domestic comedy in February 1964, adding Harry's family to the show in the eighteenth episode and beginning a process of gradually shifting the show′s focus to Harry's domestic life, with him as a father figure to his niece and nephew. The shift came too late to save the show.

Rod Amateau produced the show, and Harry Geller wrote its theme music. Silvers’ wife, Evelyn Patrick, appeared on the show in the role of Mr Osborne’s niece. Silvers's old friend Herbie Faye, who had mentored Silvers in comedy in 1932, played Waluska.

Broadcast history

The New Phil Silvers Show premiered on September 28, 1963, and initially aired on Saturdays at 8:30 p.m. Partway through November 1963, it moved to 9:30 p.m. on Saturdays, where it remained for the rest of its run. CBS cancelled it after only one season, and its last original episode aired on April 25, 1964.

After the show ended, NBC rebroadcast seven episodes of The New Phil Silvers Show as prime-time reruns during its normal time slot, four in May 1964 and three in June 1964. The last prime-time rerun aired on June 27, 1964.

In the United Kingdom, ITV broadcast The New Phil Silvers Show during 1964.

Episodes
Sources:

References

External links
 
 The New Phil Silvers Show opening credits for Episode 6 "Little Old Gluemaker, Me!" on YouTube
 The New Phil Silvers Show Episode 25 "Auntie Up" at That's Entertainment

CBS original programming
1960s American sitcoms
1963 American television series debuts
1964 American television series endings
Television shows set in Los Angeles
Works set in factories